Jorma "Joppe" Vehmanen (born 18 September 1945 in Rauma, Finland) is a retired professional ice hockey player who played in the SM-liiga.  He played for HJK Helsinki and Lukko.  He was inducted into the Finnish Hockey Hall of Fame in 1989.

References

1945 births
Ice hockey players at the 1972 Winter Olympics
Ice hockey players at the 1976 Winter Olympics
Living people
Lukko players
Olympic ice hockey players of Finland
Ice hockey players with retired numbers
People from Rauma, Finland
Sportspeople from Satakunta